Uline is a privately held American company which offers shipping and other business supplies. It was founded in 1980 by Richard and Elizabeth Uihlein. It has more than 8,000 employees and is headquartered in Pleasant Prairie, Wisconsin. It has distribution centers throughout the United States, Canada, and Mexico. The company has been noted for COVID-19 pandemic-related controversies and the Uihleins' extensive political spending on right-wing causes.

History 
Uline was founded in 1980 by Elizabeth "Liz" and Richard "Dick" Uihlein. Richard Uihlein is a descendant of the brewers of Schlitz beer. With start-up funds from his father, Edgar Uihlein, Richard and Elizabeth founded the company from their basement after recognizing a local need for a shipping supply distributor. The company's first product was the H-101 carton sizer. Its success enabled the Uihleins to move into a new headquarters in Waukegan, Illinois.

Over the 1980s and 1990s, operations began in Minnesota, California and New Jersey. In the 2000s, Uline began operations in Mexico and Canada and opened distribution centers in Illinois, Texas, Georgia, Wisconsin, and Pennsylvania. The Uline catalog grew to 450 pages, offering over 17,000 products.

In 2008, Uline announced it was constructing a new headquarters in Pleasant Prairie, Wisconsin. The move was partially motivated by the Uihleins' ties to Wisconsin; Dick Uihlein's family had lived in Milwaukee and worked at the Joseph Schlitz Brewing Company, and the couple owns a home and restaurant in Manitowish Waters. Wisconsin Governor Jim Doyle expected 1,000 jobs would move to Southeastern Wisconsin, and pledged $6 million to support the move. The 200-acre headquarters opened in the summer of 2010, featuring offices for Uline staff and a 1-million square foot warehouse which supplies products to distribution centers. Due to increasing growth, an expansion consisting of a second office building and warehouse was announced in 2014. Construction began in early 2016 and was completed in 2017. The expansion brought about 800 additional jobs to Pleasant Prairie.

In 2019, Uline began considering a second major expansion with two more distribution centers with a combined area of over 1.7 million square feet. The distribution centers would complement two existing Uline distribution centers in Pleasant Prairie.

Operations 
The company is owned by the Uihlein family and set up as a passthrough corporation. Liz Uihlein serves as president and chief executive officer, her husband Dick Uihlein is chairman of the board of directors, their children are company executives, and Dick Uihlein's brother Steve serves as a vice president. In 2014, the company was estimated to have $2 billion in revenue and more than 6,000 employees. ProPublica estimates the company made nearly a billion dollars in profit in 2018.  the company reported having over 6,700 employees and over $5.8 billion in revenue. The company has a conservative dress code, with ties mandatory for men, pantyhose and skirts for women between November and April, and tattoos discouraged.

Marketing 
An important marketing tool for Uline is its product catalog, which has been produced since its founding. Mailed twice a year, the catalog is 800 pages long and advertises over 37,500 products. Uline also relies on extensive online advertising. The company is not believed to have a communications department, and maintains a low profile on social media. Liz Uihlein frequently writes missives for the catalog, some of which reflect her political views.

Locations

Headquarters 
The headquarters consists of two buildings: a  facility, and a newer (2017) building of about the same size.

Distribution centers
 Uline has US distribution centers in Allentown, Pennsylvania; Braselton, Georgia; Coppell, Texas; Hudson, Wisconsin; Kenosha, Wisconsin; Lacey, Washington; Ontario, California; Reno, Nevada; and the Wisconsin headquarters warehouses in Pleasant Prairie, Wisconsin. It also has Canadian distribution centers in Milton, Ontario and Edmonton, Alberta and Mexican distribution centers in Mexicali and Apodaca.

Politics
Liz and Richard Uihlein are megadonors to conservative and Republican causes. The company and its employees have also extensively donated to conservative and Republican-affiliated political action committees; they were among the largest contributors to political campaigns during the 2020 election cycle, contributing over $31 million before June 2020.

COVID-19 pandemic 

On March 13, 2020, amid the COVID-19 pandemic, Liz Uihlein wrote in an email to lawmakers that the severity of the virus was being exaggerated in the media: "At what point do we go back to our normal lives? This has been a huge disruption." She reiterated her skepticism about COVID-19 in a September 2020 interview. The company and the Uihlens pushed for a recall against Democratic Wisconsin Governor Tony Evers, citing his response to the pandemic.

In November 2020, Liz Uihlein sent out a company-wide email in which she said she and Dick Uihlein had contracted COVID-19. In late February 2021, The Guardian reported the company had experienced an infection rate of 14% compared to an overall rate of 8.7% in Kenosha County, Wisconsin, where the company is headquartered; multiple employees filed workplace safety complaints with the federal government claiming that the company was exposing them to unnecessary risk.

References

External links
 

1980 establishments in Illinois
American companies established in 1980
Companies based in Wisconsin
Industrial supply companies
Kenosha County, Wisconsin
Packaging companies of the United States
Uihlein Family